The 2011 Men's NORCECA Volleyball Championship was the 22nd edition of the Men's Continental Volleyball Tournament, played from 29 August to 3 September 2011 in the Palacio de Recreación y Deportes in Mayaguez, Puerto Rico. The winner qualified for the 2011 FIVB Men's World Cup, held in November in Japan.

Teams

Squads

Pool standing procedure
 Number of matches won
 Match points
 Points ratio
 Sets ratio
 Result of the last match between the tied teams

Match won 3–0: 5 match points for the winner, 0 match point for the loser
Match won 3–1: 4 match points for the winner, 1 match points for the loser
Match won 3–2: 3 match points for the winner, 2 match points for the loser

Preliminary round
All times are Atlantic Standard Time (UTC−04:00).

Pool A

Pool B

Final round
All times are Atlantic Standard Time (UTC−04:00).

Championship bracket

5th–8th places bracket

Quarterfinals

5th–8th semifinals

Semifinals

7th place

5th place

3rd place

Final

Final standing

Awards
MVP:  Keibel Gutiérrez
Best Scorer:  Wilfredo León
Best Spiker:  Wilfredo León
Best Blocker:  David Lee
Best Server:  Fernando Hernández
Best Digger:  Keibel Gutiérrez
Best Setter:  Dustin Schneider
Best Receiver:  Keibel Gutiérrez
Best Libero:  Keibel Gutiérrez
Jim Coleman Award:  Orlando Samuels

External links
Fixtures and results

NORCECA website
Rosters

Men's NORCECA Volleyball Championship
NORCECA Men's Volleyball Championship
NORCECA Men's Volleyball Championship
2011 NORCECA Men's Volleyball Championship
2011 NORCECA Men's Volleyball Championship